Sergey Kislev (born 19 July 1960 in Kyiv, Ukrainian SSR) is a Soviet sprint canoer who competed in the late 1980s. He won a gold medal in the K-4 10000 m event at the 1986 ICF Canoe Sprint World Championships in Montreal.

References

Living people
Soviet male canoeists
1960 births
Sportspeople from Kyiv
Ukrainian male canoeists
ICF Canoe Sprint World Championships medalists in kayak